was a Japanese idol girl group. The group had two singles reach the top ten on the weekly Oricon Singles Chart, with   being their best-charting single, reaching the fifth place on the chart.

Sunmyu disbanded in 2020.

Discography

Albums

Singles

References

External links
 

Japanese idol groups
Japanese girl groups
Pony Canyon artists